Daniel Alcántar García (born 2 May 1976) is a Mexican former professional footballer, who last played for Club Necaxa.

Honours
Atlante
Mexican Primera División: Apertura 2007

External links

 Player profile 

1976 births
Living people
Sportspeople from León, Guanajuato
Footballers from Guanajuato
Association football forwards
Mexican footballers
Club León footballers
La Piedad footballers
Querétaro F.C. footballers
Irapuato F.C. footballers
Atlante F.C. footballers
Tecos F.C. footballers
San Luis F.C. players
Club Necaxa footballers
Liga MX players